Sa'id ibn Aslam ibn Zur'a al-Kilabi was the governor of Makran, i.e. the eastern frontier of the Umayyad Caliphate under al-Hajjaj ibn Yusuf, overall governor of Iraq and the eastern caliphate, in 694. He was the son of Aslam ibn Zur'a, a chief of the Banu Kilab tribe, leader of the Qays faction in the Muslim armies of Basra and Khurasan, and governor of Khurasan in 677–679. When most of al-Hajjaj's Basran troops mutinied against him at his camp in Rustuqubadh in Ahwaz after he announced a cut to their stipends, Sa'id was among those who remained loyal to him, for which he was rewarded with the governorship of Makran. Not long after taking up his post, he was killed in an attack by Muhammad and Mu'awiya, two sons of al-Harith al-Ilafi, who afterward assumed control of the frontier region. According to al-Baladhuri (d. 892), al-Hajjaj sent Mujja'a ibn Si'r as Sa'id's replacement. In the wake of Sa'id's death, al-Hajjaj adopted his son Muslim, raising him with his own children. Muslim later served as governor of Khurasan.

References

Bibliography

694 deaths
7th-century Arabs
Banu Kilab
Governors of the Umayyad Caliphate
Military personnel killed in action